This is a list of bridges and tunnels on the National Register of Historic Places in the U.S. state of Alaska.

See also
List of bridges in Alaska

References

Bridges
 
Alaska
 Bridges
Bridges